Juan de Balmaseda y Censano Beltrán (April 16, 1702, Galilea, La Rioja – May 30, 1778), interim Royal Governor of Chile.

Son of Pedro de Balmaceda and Angela Zenzano; lawyer of the Consejos de Espana, named an oidor of Chile in 1739, which became permanent November 28, 1742.  As time went on he was given additional offices.  José Antonio Manso de Velasco appointed him judge of inheritances.  Francisco José de Ovando, Marquis of Ovando appointed him protective judge of the Partido de Aconcagua on July 17, 1745.  Lastly the Viceroy of Peru Manuel de Amat y Juniet made him minister of the Royal Junta de Tabacos on July 3, 1766.  

As dean of the Royal Audiencia of Chile he became temporary governor of the Kingdom of Chile after the death of Antonio de Guill y Gonzaga on August 24, 1768.  He then campaigned against the continuing Mapuche Uprising of 1766 on the frontier in person until March 3, 1770 when the new Royal Governor Don Francisco Javier de Morales took over the position.  He retired in January 1773, and died on May 30, 1778.

Additional information

Sources

1702 births
1778 deaths
People from La Rioja
Royal Governors of Chile
18th-century Spanish people